JDR may refer to:
 Jack Del Rio (born 1963), American football player and coach
 JDR Digital Technologies Limited, now 2the Max, a Hong Kong computer hardware company
 Jutland Dragoon Regiment, regiment of the Royal Danish Army
 Juvenile and domestic relations court, Virginia court
 JDR Cables, electrical cable manufacturer
 JD-R, the job demands-resources model
 John D. Rockefeller (1839–1937), American businessman and oil tycoon